Wormley-Hoddesdonpark Wood South is a 192.5 hectare (475.6 acre) is a biological site of Special Scientific Interest near Cheshunt in Hertfordshire. It is part of Broxbourne Woods National Nature Reserve, and is listed in A Nature Conservation Review. Wormley Wood is owned and managed by the Woodland Trust. The site is also a Special Area of Conservation.

The site is oak and hornbeam woodland mainly on London clay. Plants in the variable ground flora include brambles, wood anemones and bluebells. Other habitats include marshland and acidic grassland.

White Stubbs Lane runs along the northern edge of the site.

See also
List of Sites of Special Scientific Interest in Hertfordshire

References

Wormley-Hoddesdonpark Wood South
Wormley-Hoddesdonpark Wood South
Borough of Broxbourne
Woodland Trust
Nature Conservation Review sites
Forests and woodlands of Hertfordshire